Portorož Airport  is the smallest of three international airports in Slovenia. The airport was opened on 27 September 1962. In addition to Portorož, the airport serves a number of other tourist destinations in the region, including Piran, Izola, Koper in Slovenia, Trieste in Italy and Umag in Croatia.

The airport is intended for passenger and cargo transport, sport, tourist and business flights. It lies at two metres above sea level, the runway measures .

History

As in the case of the development of many airports, Portorož Airport had a humble beginning. In 1962, ground preparations are initially made for the creation of a sports airport with a  grass runway. The following year, on 3 April 1963, Aero club Piran is formed. Later in 1963, the third Adriatic Parachute Cup competitions are held.

On 28 January 1971, the city of Piran decides to build an international sports airport at Portorož Airport. In July of the same year, the airport location is approved and the subsequent construction permits are issued for the construction and reconfiguration of the runway: 700 m long and 20 m wide (2,297 ft. long and 66 ft. wide). On 24 January 1972, the airfield construction and reconfiguration works are completed. The following year, 12 February 1973, the ZUCZP grants permission to register and license Portorož Airport for aviation sports purposes.

Further development of the airport continues, and in January 1975, the Coast Flight Centre is established. Later in 1975, construction work begins on a runway refurbishment and extension project. The first building phase of the airport terminal and platform is also initiated. The following year, on 21 August 1976, the airport re-enters full operations after construction works at the airport are completed. Work is also completed on the first phase of the airport terminal and platform. On 1 October 1978, Portorož Airport is formally re-opened and entered into the register of airports and the register for panoramic flights. In 1979, a 400 m2 aircraft hangar is constructed and the first C-172 aircraft is purchased.

Portorož Airport gained the status of a commercial passenger airport, when on 2 June 1980, the Federal Authority for Transport and Communications issues a permit that allows the airport to be operated as a category "D" airport for civilian use in both domestic and international flights. Upgrades to the airport continue, and in the same year, a fueling station, which supplies Avgas 100LL, is built. On 1 May 1981, an Aero Commander 500 (Turbo Commander) aircraft carrying 9 passengers lands from Passau. Also in 1981, the airport facilities are further expanded and include the construction of a control tower, border crossing, meteo and FIO. In 1983, the first Dash 7 lands at the airport. The following year, on 20 July 1984, the airport is registered to handle Dash-7 aircraft. On 20 March 1986, construction work is completed on a technical aircraft hangar and airport fire station. In 1989, in order to facilitate night operations, runway lighting and an approach lighting system in the vicinity of the airport are installed. As a consequence, on 21 March 1989, the Federal Secretary for Transport and Communication issues a permit, which allows night operations. Also, the ICAO classification 2C is established and the fire station receives a category 4 designation. Furthermore, a permit is issued for take-offs and landings of aircraft with a maximum weight of 27 tonnes (54,900 lbs.).

Investment in Portorož Airport continued, and on 15 April 1991, the Casino Touristic Company Turistično podjetje p.o. Portorož adopt a memorandum of understanding and form a limited liability company: Aerodrom Portorož d.o.o. From 13 to 16 May 2004, aviation enthusiasts are welcomed at Portorož Airport, where the Aviatica general aviation air show takes place. Later that year, on 1 July 2004, Aerodrom Portorož d.o.o. signs an agreement with its new partners: The Municipality of Piran; Aerodrom Ljubljana, d.d.; Istrabenz, holdinška družba, d.d.; and Luka Koper, d.d. (Port of Koper). The recapitalisation plan is intended to facilitate further development of the airport in the near future.

The entire airport is scheduled to undergo renovation in the near future.

Technical information
Although the airport fire station is currently declared CAT 2, it can be upgraded to CAT 4, provided a minimum of 12 hours advance notice is given - prior to commencement of the respective flight operations. However, unlike runway 15, runway 33 has a displaced threshold, meaning that aircraft landing on this runway, i.e. at a heading of 330°, are required to touchdown (landing) at a position approx.  from the beginning of the runway, thereby reducing the runway landing distance to approx. .

Airport services
Although relatively small, a wide-variety of services are offered at Portorož Airport:
modern airport facilities including technical and fuel service, services under contract (such as air taxi), panoramic flights, business charter flights, a flight school, parachute jumping, minibus transfer, a hotel room booking service, a restaurant, a duty-free shop as well as car rental services.

The airport has the head office of Solinair.

References

External links
Portorož Airport (official site)
Portorož Airport at A-Z World Airports Online
Taxi Airport (official site)
Ex YU Aviation Ex YU Aviation
Casas para alugar no Quadrado em Trancoso 

Airports in Slovenia
Airports established in 1962
1962 establishments in Slovenia
20th-century architecture in Slovenia